Laura Rose Farris (née McNair-Wilson; born 13 June 1978) is a British Conservative politician who has been the Member of Parliament (MP) for Newbury since the 2019 general election. Prior to her parliamentary career, she worked as a journalist and later as a barrister.

Early life
Farris was born and grew up in Bucklebury, West Berkshire, England. Both her father Michael McNair-Wilson and uncle Patrick McNair-Wilson were Conservative MPs. She studied philosophy, politics and economics at Lady Margaret Hall, Oxford, graduating in 2000 with an upper second class degree. Farris worked as a journalist for BBC and Reuters and also worked for Hillary Clinton when she was a United States Senator for New York.

She qualified as a barrister in 2007, practising mainly in employment law. Farris was appointed to the panel of counsel operated by the Equality and Human Rights Commission in 2015.

Parliamentary career
Farris was selected as the Conservative candidate for Newbury on 10 November 2019. She had previously stood as a candidate in the safe Labour seat of Leyton and Wanstead in 2017. Farris was elected as MP with a majority of 16,047 in the 2019 general election. Her father had represented the constituency between 1974 and 1992. She has been a member of the Justice Select Committee since June 2021 and the Privileges Committee and the Standards Committee since March 2022. Farris was a member of the Home Affairs Select Committee from March 2020 to March 2022. She identifies as a one-nation conservative.

On 22 October 2021, Farris opposed a bill to prevent employers from firing employees and rehiring them on worse terms and conditions. She stated during the debate that the rules on fire and rehire needed to be tightened up, but the choice should be available as "an option of last resort" for companies facing insolvency. In November 2021, a man was convicted of sending a malicious communication to Farris in 2020 and given a suspended sentence.

Farris endorsed Rishi Sunak in the July–September 2022 Conservative Party leadership election.

Personal life
Farris is married to Henry Farris and they have two daughters.

References

External links

Living people
UK MPs 2019–present
Conservative Party (UK) MPs for English constituencies
21st-century British women politicians
Female members of the Parliament of the United Kingdom for English constituencies
Members of the Parliament of the United Kingdom for constituencies in Berkshire
People from Bucklebury
Politicians from Berkshire
21st-century English women
21st-century English people
1978 births